Kam Tin Shing Mun San Tsuen or Kam Tin San Tsuen is a village in the Kam Tin area of Yuen Long District, Hong Kong.

Administration
Kam Tin San Tsuen is a recognized village under the New Territories Small House Policy.

History
Kam Tin Shing Mun San Tsuen was populated by inhabitants of Shing Mun Valley villages, who were displaced for the construction of the Shing Mun Reservoir in the late 1920s.

Features
A Hip Tin temple is located within Kam Tin Shing Mun San Tsuen. The temple is owned by the Cheng clan. It was probably built around 1920. It was relocated from Shing Mun Valley in the 1920s due to the construction of the Shing Mun Reservoir and the resulting resettlement of Shing Mun San Tsuen.

References

External links

 Delineation of area of existing village Kam Tin Shing Mun San Tsuen (Kam Tin) for election of resident representative (2019 to 2022)
 Antiquities Advisory Board. Historic Building Appraisal. Cheng Ancestral Hall, Shing Mun San Tsuen, Kam Tin Pictures
 Antiquities Advisory Board. Historic Building Appraisal. Hip Tin Temple, Shing Mun San Tsuen, Kam Tin Pictures

Villages in Yuen Long District, Hong Kong
Kam Tin